Fan of a Fan: The Album is a collaborative album by American singer Chris Brown and American rapper Tyga, billed together as Chris Brown X Tyga and was released on February 20, 2015, by RCA Records, along with affiliated record labels; including CBE Records, Last Kings Records, Young Money Entertainment, Cash Money Records and Republic Records. The album served as the sequel to their breakout mixtape Fan of a Fan (2010).

A West Coast hip hop album with glimpses of R&B, Fan of a Fan: The Album focuses on gangsta rap themes. The album debuted at number seven on the US Billboard 200 and received mixed reviews from critics.

Background and recording
In late 2012, Brown announced that him and Tyga already have recorded some songs for a sequel of Fan of a Fan entitled Fan of a Fan 2, but saying that they postponed the project because they were both busy with their solo careers. Later  the artists had sporadic recording sessions in 2013 and 2014, where they composed the album, ending its recording sessions in January 2015. When they've been asked about what gave them the idea for the project Brown said:

Music and lyrics 
Fan of a Fan: The Album themes revolve around braggadocious fast life, portraying a luxurious lifestyle, full of prominent sexual activities, multiples nights of clubbing, and supercars, as well as talking about their proficiency on the microphone. Musically the album features West Coast and DJ Mustard-ish productions, and rapping performances from both artists, with Brown doing melodic flows and R&B hooks in different tracks.

Singles
"Ayo" was released as the lead single on January 6, 2015. The track was produced by American record producers Mark Kragen and Nic Nac, whom Chris Brown and Tyga previously worked with on "Loyal".

"Bitches N Marijuana", which features a guest verse from West Coast rapper Schoolboy Q, was released as a promotional single on February 6, 2015. It was later sent to rhythmic radio as the album's second single on May 26 of that same year.

Critical reception
              
The album received mixed reviews from critics, that praised the duo's rapping, but found its lyricism to be too saturated in gangsta rap's commonplace. George Black of DJ Booth said that the album is "entertaining", praising the artists' rap performances, and stating that "the project is full of perfect clubby play-bad-boy tales. Nothing more, nothing less". Writing for Rolling Stone, Nick Murray said that "aside from the R&B apologetical cut "Better", nothing here overcomes what they previously did on their fluider previous mixtape". Gerrick D. Kennedy of the Los Angeles Times concluded that, "Overwrought with rap cliches, Fan of a Fan is a formulaic heaping of bouncy bangers primed for the strip clubs that likely inspired it. There isn't much here, besides expletive-filled musings on sex, drugs, cars and money". Marcus Dowling of HipHopDX said that "their rapping is good, Brown's hooks stick to the ear, the producers did their job right, but everything here is just so repetitive".

Commercial performance
Fan of a Fan: The Album debuted at number seven on the US Billboard 200 moving 66,000 album-equivalent units with 51,000 in pure album sales in the first week of release. In the second week the album fell at number 24, with 21,000 album-equivalent units and 12,000 in pure album sales. As of March 2015, the album has sold 72,000 copies and has been streamed 16 million times domestically. On October 1, 2021 the album was certified gold by the Recording Industry Association of America (RIAA).

In the United Kingdom, Fan of a Fan: The Album debuted at number seven on the UK Albums Chart and number one on the UK R&B Albums chart. The album was eventually certified Silver by the British Phonographic Industry (BPI) for sales of over 60,000 copies in the UK.

Track listing

Notes
 signifies a co-producer.

Sample credits
"D.G.I.F.U" samples "Forgot About Dre" by Dr. Dre and "Notorious Thugs" by The Notorious B.I.G.
"Better" samples "Take Our Time" by TLC

Charts

Weekly charts

Year-end charts

Certifications

Release history

References

External links
 

2015 albums
Chris Brown albums
Tyga albums
Albums produced by Boi-1da
Albums produced by DJ Frank E
Albums produced by DJ Mustard
Albums produced by Drumma Boy
Albums produced by Mike Free
Albums produced by Vinylz
Collaborative albums
Sequel albums